The 2010 Piazza di Siena – CSIO Rome was the 2010 edition of the CSIO Rome, the Italian official show jumping horse show, at the Piazza di Siena in Rome. It was held as CSIO 5*.

The first horse show were held 1922 at the Piazza di Siena, in 1926 it was an international horse show. Since 1928 Rome is the location of the Italian official show jumping horse show (CSIO = Concours de Saut International Officiel). 2010 is the 78th edition of the CSIO Rome.

The 2010 edition of the CSIO Rome was held between May 27, 2010 and May 30, 2010. The main sponsor of the Piazza di Siena 2010 horse show is SNAI.

FEI Nations Cup of Italy 
The 2010 FEI Nations Cup of Italy was part of the Piazza di Siena 2010 horse show. It was the second competition of the 2010 Meydan FEI Nations Cup. 

The 2010 FEI Nations Cup of Italy was held at Friday, May 28, 2010 at 3:10 pm. The competing teams were: France, the United States of America, Germany, Switzerland, the Netherlands, Ireland, Sweden, the United Kingdom, Spain and Poland. Also the team of Italy had as host nation the chance to start in the competition.

The competition was a show jumping competition with two rounds and optionally one jump-off. The height of the fences were up to 1.60 meters. Eight of ten teams were allowed to start in the second round.

The competition was endowed with 200,000 €.

(grey penalties points do not count for the team result)

Grand Prix Loro Piana 
The Grand Prix was the mayor competition of the Piazza di Siena 2010 horse show. The sponsor of this competition is Loro Piana. It was held at Sunday, May 30, 2010 at 4:00 pm. 

The competition was a show jumping competition with two rounds, the height of the fences was up to 1.60 meters. It is endowed with 200,000 €.

(Top 5 of 50 Competitors)

References

External links 
 
 2010 results

2010 in show jumping
CSIO Rome